Leslie Woods Milne (born October 17, 1956 in Framingham, Massachusetts) is a former field hockey player from the United States, who was a member of the national team that won the bronze medal at the 1984 Summer Olympics in Los Angeles, California. She had previously qualified for the 1980 Olympic team but did not compete due to the Olympic Committee's boycott of the 1980 Summer Olympics in Moscow, Russia. As consolation, she was one of 461 athletes to receive a Congressional Gold Medal many years later.

References

External links
 

1956 births
Living people
American female field hockey players
Field hockey players at the 1984 Summer Olympics
Olympic bronze medalists for the United States in field hockey
People from Framingham, Massachusetts
Medalists at the 1984 Summer Olympics
Congressional Gold Medal recipients
Williams College alumni
21st-century American women